Rock Fork Lakes Conservation Area is a nature preserve and former strip mine in Boone County, Missouri. Located north of Columbia, Missouri adjacent to Finger Lakes State Park it is over 2000 acres of lakes, wetlands, forest, and prairie. Much of the land is severely degraded from strip mining by the Peabody Coal Company from 1963 to 1972.  The land was acquired by the Missouri Department of Conservation in 1979. An unstaffed shooting range is open to the public and was renovated in 2014. The 50-acre Rocky Fork Lake has a boat ramp and is used for fishing. It is named after Rocky Fork Creek.

See also
Three Creeks Conservation Area
Eagle Bluffs Conservation Area
Rock Bridge Memorial State Park

References

External links
Official site
Area map

Conservation Areas of Missouri
Protected areas of Boone County, Missouri
Landforms of Boone County, Missouri